Edith Fowke,  (née Margaret Fulton; 30 April 1913 Lumsden, Saskatchewan<ref>{{cite web |last=Kirby |first=Allan |title=What Ordinary People Do Is Important: Edith Fowke's Life and Publications |url=http://cjtm.icaap.org/content/26/kirby.html |format=web reprint, Canadian Journal for Traditional Music (1996) |access-date=2008-03-10}}</ref> – 28 Mar 1996 Toronto) was a Canadian folklorist.  Fowke was educated at the University of Saskatchewan.  She hosted the CBC Radio program Folk Song Time from 1950 to 1963. She wrote numerous books in collaboration with folklorist and composer Richard Johnston, including Folk Songs of Canada (Waterloo Music Company 1954), Folk Songs of Quebec (Waterloo 1957), Chansons canadiennes françaises (Waterloo 1964), and More Folk Songs of Canada (Waterloo 1967). She is particularly noted for recording the songs of traditional singers O. J. Abbott,O. J. Abbott LaRena Clark,LaRena Clark and Tom Brandon.  Edith Fowke died in Toronto in 1996.

Books

 Folk Songs of Canada (1954)
 
 Lumbering Songs from the Northern Woods (1970)
Fowke, Edith and Bram Morrison (1972). Canadian vibrations = Vibrations canadiennes. Toronto: Macmillan of Canada.
 The Penguin Book of Canadian Folk Songs. Selected and Edited by Edith Fowke (1973)
  )
 Folklore of Canada:Tall Tales, Stories, Rhymes and Jokes From Every Corner of Canada (1976)Folktales of French Canada (1979)
 Singing Out History: Canada's Story in song (1984)
 Traditional Singers and Songs from Ontario by Edith Fowke and Katherine Boykowycz (1985)
 Red Rover, Red Rover: Children's Games Played in Canada (1988)
 Tales Told in Canada (1988)
 Canadian Folklore Perspectives on Canadian Folklore (1988)
 A Family Heritage: The Story and Songs of Larena Clark'' by Edith Fulton Fowke and Jay Rahn (1994)

Recordings
  Collected Folk Songs are in the Canadian Museum of Civilization

Commercially issued recordings:
 "Irish and British Songs from the Ottawa Valley" (sung by O. J. Abbott) (Folkways FM 4051)
 "Authentic Canadian Folk symbol" (sung by LaRena Clark) (Clark Records LCS 108) (1978)
 "Canada at Turn of the Sod" (sung by LaRena Clark) (LCS 110) (1979)
 "Canada's Queen of Song" (sung by LaRena Clark) (LCS 107) (1978)
 "LaRena Clark: Canadian Garland" (Topic 12T140) (1965)
 "Far Canadian Fields: Companion to the Penguin Book of Canadian Folk Songs" Leader LEE 4057 (1975)
 "Folk Songs of Ontario" (Folkways FM 4005) (1958)
 "Lumbering Songs from the Ontario Shanties" (Folkways FM 4052) (1961)
 "Tom Brandon of Peterborough, Ontario" (Folk-Legacy FSC-10) (1963)

Awards and honours
 1978: Member of the Order of Canada
1983: Fellow of Royal Society of Canada
2000: Lifetime Achievement Award, Folk Alliance (posthumous)
2011: Canadian Songwriters Hall of Fame

References

External links
 Edith Fowke archives at the Clara Thomas Archives and Special Collections, York University Libraries, Toronto, Ontario
Edith Fowke archives also at the Archives & Special Collections, University of Calgary, Calgary, Alberta

1913 births
1996 deaths
Canadian folklorists
Women folklorists
Canadian folk-song collectors
Writers from Saskatchewan
University of Saskatchewan alumni
Members of the Order of Canada